Francesco Regli (1802–1866) was an Italian writer best known today for his extensive biographical dictionary which chronicled the lives and careers of prominent figures in the performing arts in Italy from 1800 to 1860. Described as a "polygraph", Regli was also a poet, novelist, librettist, orator, theatre critic, and journalist. He was the founder and managing editor of several prominent journals of the time, including Il Pirata and Strenna Teatrale Europea.

References

External links
 Regli, Francesco (1860). Dizionario biografico: dei più celebri poéti ed artisti melodrammatici, tragici e comici, maestri, concertisti, coreografi, mimi, ballerini, scenografi, giornalisti, impresarii, ecc. ecc. che fiorirono in Italia dal 1800 al 1860. Dalmazzo (digitized copy on archive.org) 

1802 births
1866 deaths
Writers from Milan
19th-century Italian writers
19th-century male writers